Olaf Offerdahl (12 December 1857, Årdal, Sogn, Norway – 7 October 1930, Bussum, Netherlands) was apostolic administrator for Norway from 1928 to March 1930, when he was promoted to apostolic vicar, which he remained until his death later the same year.

He was born on the croft Kleivi at Årdal, Sogn. The family took the name of the farm the croft was a part of, Ofredal. Offerdahl took teacher education in Balestrand, and graduated in 1879. The same year he became a teacher in Bergen.

In autumn 1880, he began working at the Catholic elementary school in Bergen. On 31 October the same year, he converted from the Norwegian Church to the Catholic Church. In autumn 1884, he began his priestly studies, first in Turnhout in Belgium to 1886 and then at Urbana Collegio de Propaganda Fide in Rome for 1892.

Offerdahl was ordained a priest on 22 November 1891 by Cardinal Lucido Maria Parocchi and summer of 1892 he returned to Norway. He was chaplain in Tromsø to January 1894, temporary (acting minister) the same place until July 1895 and then pastor in Tromsø in 1897. He was then transferred to St. Olav Church in Oslo, where he was chaplain to 1907 and as vicar until 1923. Then, he was parish priest in Arendal to June 1924, and as pastor of St. Hallvard's church in Oslo, he took over as the apostolic administrator in 1928.

On 12 March 1925, he had been appointed Chaplain, and in June the same year he was provicar, that is representative of the apostolic vicar, Johannes Olav Smit. When Smit resigned  on 11 October 1928, Offer Dahl was appointed apostolic administrator, and on 13 March 1930 he was appointed Apostolic Vicar. On 6 April 1930, he was consecrated as the first Norwegian bishop since the Reformation. Cardinal Wilhelm van Rossum ordained him as titular bishop of Selje.

That fall, he became seriously ill during a trip to the Netherlands. On 7 October 1930, he died in Bussum, Netherlands. He is buried at Our Savior's Cemetery in Oslo.

External links
Profile, Catholic-Hierarchy.org.

Converts to Roman Catholicism from Lutheranism
20th-century Roman Catholic bishops in Norway
1857 births
1930 deaths
20th-century Roman Catholic titular bishops
Norwegian Roman Catholic bishops